The 1999 Amber Valley Borough Council election took place on 6 May 1999 to elect members of Amber Valley Borough Council in Derbyshire, England. One third of the council was up for election and the Labour Party stayed in overall control of the council.

After the election, the composition of the council was
Labour 32
Conservative 11

Election result

References

1999
1999 English local elections
1990s in Derbyshire